Dilolo Airport  is an airstrip serving the town of Dilolo in Lualaba Province, Democratic Republic of the Congo.

See also

Transport in the Democratic Republic of the Congo
 List of airports in the Democratic Republic of the Congo

References

External links
 OpenStreetMap - Dilolo Airport
 FallingRain - Dilolo Airport
 HERE Maps - Dilolo Airport
 OurAirports - Dilolo Airport
 

Airports in Lualaba Province